The gray cat snake (Boiga siamensis), also known as eyed cat snake or Siamese cat snake is a species of catsnake found in northeastern India, Bangladesh, Myanmar, Cambodia, Thailand, Malaysia,  Vietnam. and Nepal

Description
The Siamese cat snake resembles the dog-toothed snake but it occupies a different geographical range. It is a large snake, reaching almost 2 m (6 1⁄2 ft) in total length. Colours are greyish-brown with black crossbars that are most distinct interiorly. The head is dark brown with a dark streak from behind the eye to the first body crossbar that is broken just beyond the last supralabial. The chin and throat are white, the ventrals white to light brown

Behavior and venom
Mostly nocturnal, it is a potentially aggressive snake. It is a rear fanged venom snake but there are not known casualties registered.

Geographic range
It is found in India, Bangladesh, Myanmar, Cambodia, Thailand,  Nepal,   Malaysia, and Vietnam. It is also found in Laos.

Habitat
These snakes are found in forest-hills and plains and can be found up to 1,700 m (5,577 ft.). They are arboreal but can be found near water too.

Diet
This snake feeds on, birds, and eggs.

Reproduction
Boiga siamensis is an oviparous species, with sexually mature females laying eggs, 6–12 per clutch

Gallery

References

siamensis
Snakes of Vietnam
Snakes of Asia
Reptiles of Bangladesh
Reptiles of Cambodia
Reptiles of India
Reptiles of the Malay Peninsula
Reptiles of Myanmar
Reptiles of Thailand
Reptiles of Vietnam
Reptiles described in 1971